Alexis Tameron Kinsey is a former Chairman of the Arizona Democratic Party.
Tameron Kinsey, was chief of staff for Congressman Harry Mitchell and campaign manager on Richard Carmona's 2012 U.S. Senate bid. She was the first woman to lead the Arizona Democratic Party. Tameron Kinsey was a super delegate to the 2016 Democratic National convention, she did not endorse a candidate before the convention.

Tameron Kinsey stepped down in October 2017 after selling her home and changing Legislative Districts which left her no longer eligible to serve in the role.

References

External links
 Democratic Officer website
 

Year of birth missing (living people)
Living people
Arizona State University alumni
Princeton University alumni
Arizona Democrats
Politicians from Tempe, Arizona
Arizona Democratic Party chairs